Nuran is a village and municipality in the Agsu Rayon of Azerbaijan.  It has a population of 379. The municipality consists of the villages of Nuran and Zərqava.

References 

Populated places in Agsu District